Uppalapadu is a village in the Guntur district of the Indian state of Andhra Pradesh. It is located in Pedakakani mandal of Guntur revenue division.

Geography 

Bird sanctuary 

The Bird Center is located just after the village entrance. The water tanks in the village are unique as they provide refuge to many species of birds, including endangered spot-billed pelicans and painted storks. The birds migrate here from various places such as Siberia, and use the center for nesting.

Government and politics 

Uppalapadu gram panchayat is the local self-government of the village. It is divided into wards and each ward is represented by a ward member. The ward members are headed by a Sarpanch. The village forms a part of Andhra Pradesh Capital Region and is under the jurisdiction of APCRDA.

Education 

As per the school information report for the academic year 2018–19, the village has a total of 7 schools. These include 5 Zilla Parishad/Mandal Parishad and 2 private schools.

See also 
List of villages in Guntur district

References

External links 

Uppalapadu on BirdLife.Org
"RAM ROBERT RAHIM DETECTIVE PRODUCTIONS; UPPALAPADU; PEDAKAKANI MANDALAM; GUNTUR (DT.; A.P., INDIA-522509; Mobile 098495 69109"

Villages in Guntur district